The 1991 Campionati Internazionali di Sicilia was a men's tennis tournament played on outdoor clay courts in Palermo, Italy that was part of the World Series of the 1991 ATP Tour. It was the 13th edition of the tournament and took place from 23 September until 29 September 1991. Unseeded Frédéric Fontang won the singles title.

Finals

Singles
 Frédéric Fontang defeated  Emilio Sánchez 1–6, 6–3, 6–3
 It was Fontang's only singles title of his career.

Doubles
 Jacco Eltingh /  Tom Kempers defeated  Emilio Sánchez /  Javier Sánchez 3–6, 6–3, 6–3

References

External links
 ITF – tournament edition details

Campionati Internazionali di Sicilia
Campionati Internazionali di Sicilia
Campionati Internazionali di Sicilia